Frogbit or frog's bit is a common name for several plants in the family Hydrocharitaceae and may refer to:
Hydrocharis morsus-ranae - European frogbit
Limnobium laevigatum - Amazon frogbit, South American frogbit

See also
 Ranunculus hydrocharoides, frog's bit buttercup